William John Watts (May 1, 1846 – September 4, 1907) was a businessman, lawyer and political figure in Quebec. He represented Drummond-Arthabaska in the Legislative Assembly of Quebec from 1874 to 1885 and Drummond from 1890 to 1892 and from 1897 to 1901 as a Conservative.

He was born in Drummondville, Canada East, the son of Robert Nugent Watts and Charlotte Sheppard. Watts studied at McGill University, was called to the Quebec bar in 1869 and set up practice in Drummondville. He also owned several mills. He was first elected to the Quebec assembly in an 1874 by-election held after Wilfrid Laurier was elected to the House of Commons. In 1882, he married Mary Louisa Millar. Watts resigned his seat in 1885 following the execution of Louis Riel. He was defeated by Joseph Peter Cooke when he ran for reelection in 1890. He resigned his seat in 1901 after he was named registrar for Montreal West and served until his death in Drummondville at the age of 61.

External links

References

1846 births
1907 deaths
Conservative Party of Quebec MNAs